Marble Canyon is a populated place in Coconino County, Arizona, United States. Marble Canyon has a post office with ZIP code 86036. Marble Canyon is near Lee's Ferry, the former location of a ferry established by John D. Lee, a Mormon settler. It is often used by people entering the Colorado River for fishing and rafting trips.

Climate
According to the Köppen Climate Classification system, Marble Canyon has a semi-arid climate, abbreviated "BSk" on climate maps.

Transportation
Trans-Canyon Shuttle offers a seasonal daily shuttle between Grand Canyon Village.

References

Unincorporated communities in Coconino County, Arizona
Unincorporated communities in Arizona